Svenja Bazlen (born 3 January 1984, in Stuttgart) is a German professional triathlete, and a reserve member of the National Team (B-Kader). Together with Anja Dittmer she qualified for the Olympic Games in London 2012.

In 2009 Svenja Bazlen finished her studies in physical education and moved to Freiburg, where the Olympic high performance centre is located.
In France, Bazlen represents the Tri Club Chateauroux 36 in the prestigious French Club Championship Series Lyonnaise des Eaux.
In Germany, like Ricarda Lisk she represents VfL Waiblingen.

ITU Competitions 

In the five years from 2007 to 2011, Bazlen took part in 30 ITU competitions and achieved 8 top ten positions.
Bazlen and Anja Dittmer will represent Germany at the London 2012 Olympics.

The following list is based upon the official ITU rankings and the ITU Athletes's Profile Page.
Unless indicated otherwise, the following events are triathlons (Olympic Distance) and refer to the Elite category.

DNF = did not finish · DNS = did not start · BG = the sponsor British Gas

Notes

External links
 Bazlen’s official website

1984 births
Living people
German female triathletes
Sportspeople from Stuttgart
Triathletes at the 2012 Summer Olympics
Olympic triathletes of Germany